Dasysphinx volatilis is a moth of the subfamily Arctiinae. It was described by Schaus in 1910. It is found in Costa Rica.

References

Euchromiina